If I Could Make It Go Quiet (stylized in all lowercase) is the debut studio album by Norwegian musician Girl in Red, released independently through AWAL and her own World in Red label on 30 April 2021, after being delayed due to the COVID-19 pandemic. It was primarily produced by the musician herself alongside Matias Tellez and features additional production from Finneas O'Connell.

Sonically, it has been described as a more ambitious, mature, and developed continuation of the musician's previous bedroom pop and indie rock musical style established in the early EPs Chapter 1 (2018) and Chapter 2 (2019). Lyrically, the singer has described the record as an "emotional recap" of the year 2020 in which she explores her personal mental health experiences as well as "the different sides of love".

Album reviews

if i could make it go quiet received mostly positive reviews from music critics, praising the vocal performance, songwriting, lyrical content, production and visual style for the album. Some critics felt that the album was Girl in Red's best work to date. On Metacritic, which assigns a normalized score out of 100 to ratings from publications, the album received an average score of 77 based on 14 reviews, indicating "generally favorable reviews".

Background and release
In late 2019 and early 2020, Girl in Red began continuously teasing and hinting at the phrase "World in Red". She told Billboard in September 2019 that this would be the title of her debut album which would be released in October 2020, and that 2020 would be her year of "world domination", but this plan was spoiled due to the impact of the COVID-19 pandemic on the music industry. She told NME in April 2020, that "[the COVID-19 pandemic] ain't gonna stop World In Red, baby!" In April 2020, the single "Midnight Love" was released as the lead single and first taste from what was then deemed Girl in Red's debut album. "Rue" was released as the second single in August 2020. "Serotonin" was released as the third single soon after the album's announcement on social media in early March 2021. The official album cover was revealed with this announcement to be a painting by Norwegian artist Fredrik Wiig Sørensen. "Serotonin" premiered as Irish DJ Annie Mac's Hottest Record on BBC Radio 1, where Girl in Red herself deemed it "the biggest track [she's] ever put out" and "the best track [she] has ever written or produced".

"Apartment 402" was featured on the soundtrack of FIFA 22.

Recording and concept
The record was primarily produced by Girl in Red and Norwegian musician Matias Tellez, making it the first time in the former's career that she has worked with a record producer other than herself. The album's second single, "Rue", was inspired by the titular fictional character for the American TV series Euphoria, while its third single, "Serotonin", also features additional production from American record producer Finneas O'Connell. The latter deemed it "one of the coolest songs [he had] ever heard" and revealed that he was "thrilled that [he] got to be a part of it." Girl in Red revealed to NME that she's "definitely confronting [her]self on this album" and described the record as "cohesive". She also told Insider about her plans and ambitions for the album's rollout and recording, noting that it "promises a more developed and mature sound." The song "Serotonin" explores her personal struggles with intrusive thoughts which she claimed to have experienced for over 10 years.

Track listing

Notes
 "." is pronounced as period

Charts

Release history

References

External links
 

2021 debut albums
Girl in Red albums
Albums produced by Finneas O'Connell
Albums produced by Girl in Red
Albums produced by Matias Tellez
AWAL albums
Impact of the COVID-19 pandemic on the music industry
Cultural responses to the COVID-19 pandemic